"Girls" is the first single from Beenie Man's album Undisputed featuring Akon. In 2011, it was remixed by DJ Rico Bernasconi. It was subsequently released as a single which was credited to as 'Rico Bernasconi & Beenie Man featuring Akon.'

Music video
The music video, directed by Little X, premiered on June 7 on Tempo TV. Before the video was aired, a "behind-the-scenes" video was exclusively aired to Tempo on the same day.

Charts

References

2006 singles
Reggae songs
Akon songs
Music videos directed by Director X
Beenie Man songs
2006 songs
Virgin Records singles